Chima is a town and municipality in the Santander Department of northeastern Colombia.

Municipalities of Santander Department